The Royal Scottish Automobile Club (RSAC) Scottish Rally is the highlight of the Scottish Rally Championship and the longest-standing rally event in Scotland, having been first contested in 1932. The event takes place in May or June of every year and the organisation claims that the warm weather and unique forest stages draw competitors from around the world. The rally has previously hosted a round of the World Rally Championship, enjoying the status of being a round of the Rally Championship for Drivers in 1978, and it also spent 26 years on the calendar of the European Rally Championship but in recent years it has been limited to being a round of the Scottish Rally Championship.

History
The first Scottish rally took place from 4 to 9 July 1932 on a route of approximately  through Scotland and England and consisted of six days of competition with participants beginning the rally at one of six start points in Glasgow, Edinburgh, Aberdeen, London, Harrogate and Droitwich. The first day involved competitors travelling from their chosen starting point before all rendezvousing in Scotland later in the event and finally ending in Edinburgh. Unlike in modern rallies where the object is to complete the course in as short a time as possible, competitors were set an average speed that they were expected to maintain on each stage. Points were awarded for meeting this target, the condition of the car at the end of the stage, and even for the number of occupants of each vehicle. There were also tests of driver and vehicle such as accelerating and braking challenges and "kerb driving" (driving as close as possible to the kerb without touching it). There were even dances organised in the evenings to allow drivers to socialise.

There was no single overall winner of the rally but G.F. Dennison (driving a Riley) was crowned champion of the small car category, while the large car category was won by J.S. Couldrey in a Hudson. There were also control prizes awarded for the best performer from each of the six starting points.

It was not until 1961 that a driver was awarded the overall winner's title, John Melvin being the first driver to receive that honour. The event used to enjoy International status, however since 1988, as the World Rally Championship moved to include only one event per country, it has been reduced to a National event in favour of the RAC Rally in Wales. Over the years, the event has been based in towns and cities throughout Scotland including Glasgow, Perth, Inverness and Dunoon. However, since 1997 it has been centered in Dumfries in South West Scotland.

The Scottish Rally formed part of the European Rally Championship from 1970 until 1996, but arguably its biggest moment came in 1978 when it formed part of the Cup for Rally Drivers. There was no World Championship title for rally drivers at this point, but the title was the precursor to today's World Rally Championship drivers' champion.

Notable winners of the Scottish Rally include Roger Clark, Hannu Mikkola, Stig Blomqvist, Ari Vatanen, Tony Pond, Malcolm Wilson, Richard Burns and Colin McRae. The most successful drivers in the event's history are Roger Clark and David Bogie, who tied Clark's record of six wins in 2019.

List of winners
A full list of rally winners from the first time a single overall winner was recognised in 1961 until the present day is shown in the table below, along with their co-drivers and the car being driven.

References

External links
 Official Rally Website
 RSAC Official Website

1932 establishments in Scotland
Scottish Rally Championship
Rally competitions in the United Kingdom
Motorsport in Scotland
Sports competitions in Scotland
Motorsport competitions in the United Kingdom
European Rally Championship rallies